Richard Culek (born 1 April 1974 in Liberec) is a Czech football midfielder. He currently plays for Bocholter VV.

He also played for Slovan Liberec, FK Švarc Benešov, Chemnitzer FC, FC Bohemians Praha, KFC Lommelse SK, K.V.C. Westerlo, FC Brussels and FK Viktoria Žižkov.

References

External links
 
 
 
 

1974 births
Living people
Czech footballers
Czech Republic under-21 international footballers
Czech expatriate footballers
Association football midfielders
Czech First League players
FC Slovan Liberec players
SK Benešov players
Bohemians 1905 players
FK Viktoria Žižkov players
Chemnitzer FC players
K.V.C. Westerlo players
R.W.D.M. Brussels F.C. players
2. Bundesliga players
Expatriate footballers in Belgium
Sportspeople from Liberec
K.F.C. Lommel S.K. players